Sergei Gennadyievich Demekhine (Russian: Сергей Геннадьевич Демёхин; born 30 March 1984) is a Russian tennis coach and former player. Under his guidance, Vera Zvonareva reached two Grand Slam finals – at the 2010 Wimbledon Championships and the 2010 US Open — and World No. 2 ranking. Demekhine also occasionally used to work as a model for Armani, Rocco Barocco, and Abercrombie & Fitch.

Personal life 
Demekhine was born on 30 March 1984 in Kursk and currently resides in Moscow.

Since 2017, he has been married to Russian tennis player Veronika Kudermetova, whom he also coaches.

Tennis career 
As a professional tennis player, Demekhine won one ITF Futures title in singles, and eight in doubles. He played the qualifications for the Kremlin Cup in 2001, 2002, 2003 2006 and 2008, but never reached the main draw. Demekhin made two appearances in the ATP main draw in doubles, both at the Kremlin Cup. In 2005, he and Igor Kunitsyn lost to Mariusz Fyrstenberg and Răzvan Sabău 5–3, 5–4(6) in the first round. In 2008, Demekhin partnered with Konstantin Kravchuk, but they were beaten by Sergiy Stakhovsky and Potito Starace 7–6(4), 1–6, [10–7] in the first round. He has been inactive since 2009.

Coaching career 
Demekhine briefly coached Russian player Alla Kudryavtseva, then coached Vera Zvonareva. The two began working together in April 2010 after the 2010 Family Circle Cup in Charleston, South Carolina. At first, he was her hitting partner and then became her coach. Under his guidance, Zvonareva reached the finals of the 2010 Wimbledon Championships and the 2010 US Open, the semifinals of the 2011 Australian Open, and the World No. 2 ranking. In April 2011 ,Vera Zvonareva split with Demekhine.

He currently is coaching his wife Veronika Kudermetova.

Career statistics

IFT Futures singles finals (1–0)

ITF Futures doubles finals (8–12)

References

External links 

1984 births
Living people
Sportspeople from Kursk
Russian male models
Russian male tennis players
Russian tennis coaches